Pavle Nenadović (1703–1768) was the Serbian Orthodox Archbishop and Metropolitan of Karlovci from 1749 to 1768.

Biography
Pavle Nenadović was born on 14 January 1703 in Budim, Hungary. At the age of eighteen, he was employed as a clerk in the Budim Magistrates Office. He became a Serbian Orthodox cleric in 1726, after which he took monastic vows in the Rakovac Monastery. In 1737, Serbian Patriarch Arsenije IV appointed Pavle as his general exarch, and in 1742 the patriarch appointed him as the bishop of the Eparchy of upper Karlovac.

Arsenije IV also commissioned Pavle Nenadović, a cleric who was by then well known as a poet, to compose a heraldic handbook, Stemmatographia (meaning "the drawing of ancestry" in Greek). This heraldic album was modelled after a book of the same title on Slavonic heraldic bearings, engraved in 1701 by Croatian poet Pavao Ritter Vitezović (who modelled his Stemmatographia after an older version of Slavic heraldry composed by Mavro Orbini). Arsenije IV's Stemmatographia was perceived by some as an illustrated political programme that was supposed to act both as a verification of the Serbian historical past and as a clear geopolitical statement of the lands belonging to the Serbs in the Balkans. His intention, however, was educational, and for this work he hired three people: Hristofor Zhefarovich originally from Dojran as an artist; German-born Thomas Mesmer as an engraver; and clergyman Pavle Nenadović as a poet.

In 1748, Pavle Nenadović was elected Bishop of Arad, but shortly after the death of metropolitan Isaija Antonović he was chosen to succeed him as new metropolitan of Karlovci in 1749. He worked on the promotion of culture and education of the Serbs in the Habsburg monarchy. A result of his work was a significant increase of interest in science and literature among the Serbs. Metropolitan Pavle fought against the conversion of Serbs in Croatia and Romanians in Transilvania into Uniates. He died on 15 August 1768.

Legacy
He is included in The 100 most prominent Serbs.

See also
 Metropolitanate of Karlovci
 List of heads of the Serbian Orthodox Church

References

Sources

 

18th-century Serbian people
18th-century Eastern Orthodox bishops
Metropolitans of Karlovci
Eastern Orthodox Christians from Serbia
Clergy from Budapest
Serbs of Hungary
Habsburg Serbs
1703 births
1768 deaths